Nassarius tritoniformis is a species of sea snail, a marine gastropod mollusc in the family Nassariidae, the nassa mud snails or dog whelks.

Description
The length of the shell varies between 15 mm and 25 mm

Distribution
This species occurs in the Atlantic Ocean off Angola and Senegal

References

 Cernohorsky W. O. (1984). Systematics of the family Nassariidae (Mollusca: Gastropoda). Bulletin of the Auckland Institute and Museum 14: 1–356. 
 Adam W. & Knudsen J. 1984. Révision des Nassariidae (Mollusca : Gastropoda Prosobranchia) de l’Afrique occidentale. Bulletin de l'Institut Royal des Sciences Naturelles de Belgique 55(9): 1–95, 5 pl.
 Gofas, S.; Afonso, J.P.; Brandào, M. (Ed.). (S.a.). Conchas e Moluscos de Angola = Coquillages et Mollusques d'Angola. [Shells and molluscs of Angola]. Universidade Agostinho / Elf Aquitaine Angola: Angola. 140 pp.
 Bernard, P.A. (Ed.) (1984). Coquillages du Gabon [Shells of Gabon]. Pierre A. Bernard: Libreville, Gabon. 140, 75 plates pp

External links
 
 

Nassariidae
Gastropods described in 1841